The Uganda Game and Fisheries Department was the lead wildlife conservation agency of the Uganda Protectorate. It was merged into the Uganda Wildlife Authority in 1996.

Wardens
The Director of the Department was originally the Warden and later Chief Warden. Charles Pitman held the post from 1924 until he was replaced in 1951 by Bruce Kinloch.

Notes

References

External links

Nature conservation in Uganda
Government ministries of Uganda